Llucmajor is a Barcelona Metro station, on L4.
The station is located under Passeig de Verdum, between carrer de Lorena and carrer de Formentor, and can be accessed from that intersection and from Jardins d'Alfàbia.

Services

See also
List of Barcelona Metro stations

External links

Trenscat.com

Railway stations in Spain opened in 1982
Transport in Nou Barris
Barcelona Metro line 4 stations